Hodgson Academy (formerly Hodgson School) is a coeducational secondary school located in Poulton-le-Fylde in the English county of Lancashire.

Hodgson was inspected by the office for standards in education (OFSTED) as Outstanding, the best a school can be.

 Hodgson Academy offers GCSEs, BTECs and some AS Level courses as programmes of study for pupils. Most graduating pupils go on to attend Blackpool Sixth Form College or Blackpool and the Fylde College.

History 
The school was established in 1932 and was named after Alderman William Hodgson JP, who was chairman of Lancashire Education Authority at this time.

The school converted to academy status in May 2011 and was renamed Hodgson Academy.

Notable former staff
Tony Green, footballer

Notable former students
Lucy Fallon, actress

References

External links
Hodgson Academy official website

Secondary schools in Lancashire
Buildings and structures in Poulton-le-Fylde
Educational institutions established in 1932
1932 establishments in England
Schools in the Borough of Wyre
Academies in Lancashire